60 Second Docs is a web series produced by Indigenous Media of original, short documentary videos produced and distributed weekly. The series launched on 26 July 2016 with two original videos. In 2019 the series received the Webby Award for Video - Documentary.

The series has been described as  "to capture the human experience by highlighting the most interesting and unusual characters on the planet". Some videos garnering a large amount of views are "Areola Tattoos", "Mommy Milk Factory", "DIY Horror Makeup", "Flip-Flop Art", "Autism Car Wash", and "Daddy Daughter Hair School".

The videos were first distributed on Facebook, YouTube, and Vidme and now distribution channels include Twitter, Instagram and Snapchat. A partnership announced in April, 2019 with Howie Mandel's Alevy Productions brings the series to television.

In 2017, Viacom Velocity made a deal with Indigenous Media for a one-year partnership for content production.

As of April 2019, 60 Second Docs has "produced over 450 documentaries, and generated over 3.5 Billion views and 7 million followers".

It was announced in July, 2019 that 60 Second Docs will create a monthly series to highlight "human interest stories" from GoFundMe.

Accolades

References

External links 
 60 Second Docs Facebook Page
 60 Second Docs Instagram

American non-fiction web series
2010s YouTube series
2016 web series debuts
2010s American documentary television series
2020s YouTube series